Pinch bug, pinchbug, or pincher bug may refer to:

Stag beetles, insects belonging to the family Lucanidae
Earwigs, insects belonging to the order Dermaptera
 Members of the crab family Chirostylidae, which together with families Galatheidae and Kiwaidae are also commonly known as squat lobsters
Crayfish, freshwater crustaceans belonging to the superfamilies Astacoidea and Parastacoidea

Animal common name disambiguation pages